God of Thunder may refer to:

 A thunder god
 Thor Hushovd, nicknamed The God of Thunder, former Norwegian professional road bicycle racer
 God of Thunder (EP), an EP by White Zombie
 "God of Thunder" (song), by the rock band Kiss
 God of Thunder (video game), a 2D freeware puzzle game for MS-DOS
 Thor: God of Thunder, a video game based on the movie Thor
 God of Thunder (1971 film), a film by Ousmane Sembène also known as Emitaï
 God of Thunder (2015 film), an American film

See also
 List of thunder gods
 Leishen (雷神) God of Thunder
 Leigong (雷公) Lord of Thunder